Austrian Silesia, officially the Duchy of Upper and Lower Silesia, was an autonomous region of the Kingdom of Bohemia and the Habsburg monarchy (from 1804 the Austrian Empire, and from 1867 Cisleithanian Austria-Hungary). It is largely coterminous with the present-day region of Czech Silesia and was, historically, part of the larger Silesia region.

Geography

Austrian Silesia consisted of two territories, separated by the Moravian land strip of Moravská Ostrava between the Ostravice and Oder rivers.

The area east of the Ostravice around Cieszyn reached from the heights of the Western Carpathians (Silesian Beskids) in the south, where it bordered with the Kingdom of Hungary, along the Olza and upper Vistula rivers to the border with Prussian Silesia in the north. In the east the Biała river at Bielsko separated it from the Lesser Polish lands of the Polish–Lithuanian Commonwealth, incorporated into the Austrian Kingdom of Galicia and Lodomeria upon the First Partition of Poland in 1772.

The territory west of the Oder river stretching from the town of Opava up to Bílá Voda was confined by the Jeseníky mountain range of the eastern Sudetes in the south, separating it from Moravia, and the Opava river in the north. In the west the Golden Mountains formed the border with the County of Kladsko.

History
The area originally formed the south-eastern part of the Medieval Duchy of Silesia. During the 14th century the Dukes of Silesia were vassals of the King of Bohemia. As part of the Lands of the Bohemian Crown, Silesia was inherited by the Habsburg Archduke Ferdinand I of Austria in 1526, after King Louis II of Bohemia had died at the Battle of Mohács. With the female succession of the Habsburg empress Maria Theresa to the throne in 1740, the Prussian king Frederick the Great laid claim to the Silesian province and, without waiting for any reply, on 16 December started the First Silesian War, thereby opening the larger War of the Austrian Succession. His campaign was concluded in 1742 with the Prussian victory at the Battle of Chotusitz leading to the treaties of Breslau and Berlin, in which Silesia was divided. 

Under the terms of the treaty, the Kingdom of Prussia received most of the territory including the Bohemian County of Kladsko, while only a small part of southeastern Silesia remained with the Habsburg monarchy, consisting of:
the Upper Silesian duchy of Teschen (Cieszyn)
parts of the former Moravian Duchy of Opava  with Duchy of Krnov south of the Opava River, comprising several Moravian enclaves.
the southern part of the Lower Silesian Duchy of Nysa  around Jeseník
forming the Duchy of Upper and Lower Silesia, which remained a Bohemian crown land with its capital in the city of Opava. In 1766 the title of a Duke of Teschen was granted to Prince Albert of Saxony, son-in-law of Maria Theresa, while the title of a Duke of Troppau and Jägerndorf remained with the House of Liechtenstein. The Nysa territory was held by the Bishops of Wrocław with their residence at Castle Jánský Vrch (Johannisberg).

When in 1804 the Habsurg emperor Francis II established the Austrian Empire, his title would include the "Duke of Upper and Lower Silesia". Austrian Silesia was connected by rail with the Austrian capital Vienna, when the Emperor Ferdinand Northern Railway line was extended to Bohumín station in 1847. In the course of the Austro-Hungarian Compromise of 1867 the Duchy of Upper and Lower Silesia became a crown land of Cisleithanian Austria.

In November 1918 the Dual Monarchy was abolished. The major part of Austrian Silesia was ceded to the newly created state of Czechoslovakia by the 1919 Treaty of Saint-Germain-en-Laye, with the exception of Cieszyn Silesia (the former Duchy of Teschen), which after the Polish–Czechoslovak War was split in 1920 along the Olza river with its eastern part falling to the Autonomous Silesian Voivodeship of Poland. Smaller parts of the duchy also became a part of Poland, while the adjacent Hlučín Region of Prussian Silesia fell to Czechoslovakia.

Demographics
According to an Austrian census, Austrian Silesia in 1910 was home to 756,949 people, speaking the following languages:
43% - German
31% - Polish
24% - Czech

Major towns
Towns with more than 5,000 people in 1880:

Linguistic distribution (1851–1910)

Linguistic distribution by district (1910)

Administration

The Duchy of Upper and Lower Silesia was originally divided into the two districts (Bezirke) of Teschen (Těšínský kraj, pop. 213,040 in 1847) and Troppau (Opavský kraj, pop. 260,199) with its seat at Krnov. In eastern Teschen, the autonomous Duchy of Bielsko was established in 1754. Upon the Revolutions of 1848 and up to its dissolution Austrian Silesia was intermittently re-organised into the districts of:

 Bielitz (Bielsko)
 Freistadt (Fryštát)
 Freiwaldau (Frývaldov)
 Freudenthal (Bruntál)
 Friedek (Frýdek)
 Jägerndorf (Krnov)
 Teschen (Cieszyn/Těšín)
 Troppau (Opava)
 Wagstadt (Bílovec).

For example, in 1900, there were 8 Bezirkshauptmannschaften in Austrian Silesia (in comparison to above list without Frydek).

Notes

References

External links 

States and territories disestablished in 1918
States and territories established in 1742
Habsburg Silesia
Subdivisions of Austria-Hungary
Lands of the Empire of Austria (1867–1918)
1742 establishments in the Holy Roman Empire
1742 establishments in the Habsburg monarchy
History of Czech Silesia
Former monarchies of Europe